For music from a year in the 1950s, go to 50 | 51 | 52 | 53 | 54 | 55 | 56 | 57 | 58 | 59

This is a partial list of notable active and inactive bands and musicians of the 1950s.

Musicians

 Black Ace
 Johnny Ace
 Lee Allen
 Gene Allison
 Marian Anderson
 Pink Anderson
 Paul Anka
 Louis Armstrong
 Eddy Arnold
 Chet Atkins
 Gene Autry
 Frankie Avalon
 Charles Aznavour
 LaVern Baker
 Hank Ballard
 Sidney Bechet
 Harry Belafonte
 Jesse Belvin
 Tex Beneke
 Boyd Bennett
 Tony Bennett
 Chuck Berry
 Richard Berry
 Otis Blackwell
 Scrapper Blackwell
 Blind Blake
 The Big Bopper
 Johnny Bond
 Pat Boone
 Jimmy Bowen
 Calvin Boze
 Jackie Brenston
 Teresa Brewer
 Big Bill Broonzy
 Clarence "Gatemouth" Brown
 James Brown
 Nappy Brown
 Roy Brown
 Ruth Brown
 Dave Brubeck
 Jimmy Bryant
 Solomon Burke
 Johnny Burnette
 James Burton
 Erskine Butterfield
 Sam Butera
 Maria Callas
 Glen Campbell
 Martha Carson
 Goree Carter
 Johnny Cash
 Bobby Charles
 Ray Charles
 Boozoo Chavis
 Chubby Checker
 Clifton Chenier
 Lou Christie
 June Christy
 Eugene Church
 Joe Clay
 Dee Clark
 Patsy Cline
 Rosemary Clooney
 Eddie Cochran
 Nat "King" Cole
 John Coltrane
 Perry Como
 Floyd Council
 Pee Wee Crayton
 Mac Curtis
 Bing Crosby
 Bob Crosby
 Gary Crosby
 Arthur Crudup
 Dick Dale
 Dick Dale (singer)
 Dalida
 Bobby Darin
 Hal David
 Miles Davis
 Sammy Davis, Jr.
 Bobby Day
 Doris Day
 Bo Diddley
 Willie Dixon
 Carl Dobkins, Jr.
 Bill Doggett
 Fats Domino
 Lonnie Donegan
 Jimmy Dorsey
 Lee Dorsey
 Tommy Dorsey
 K. C. Douglas
 Rusty Draper
 Champion Jack Dupree
 Jimmy Durante
 Leroy Van Dyke
 Werly Fairburn
 H-Bomb Ferguson
 Eddie Fisher
 Miss Toni Fisher
 Sonny Fisher
 Ella Fitzgerald
 Connie Francis
 Ernie Freeman
 Mary Ford
 Tennessee Ernie Ford
 Helen Forrest
 Alan Freed
 Johnny Fuller
 Billy Fury
 Earl Gaines
 Hank Garland
 Judy Garland
 Clarence Garlow
 Georgia Gibbs
 Dizzy Gillespie
 Dick Glasser
 Arthur Godfrey
 Benny Goodman
 Eydie Gormé
 Charlie Gracie
 Gogi Grant
 Jack Guthrie
 Roy Hamilton
 Lionel Hampton
 Pat Hare
 Slim Harpo
 Homer Harris
 Peppermint Harris
 Wynonie Harris
 Hawkshaw Hawkins
 Screamin' Jay Hawkins
 Al Hibbler
 Chuck Higgins
 Earl Hines
 Silas Hogan
 Smokey Hogg
 Ron Holden
 Billie Holiday
 Buddy Holly
 John Lee Hooker
 Lightnin' Hopkins
 Johnny Horton
 David Houston
 Ivory Joe Hunter
 Bull Moose Jackson
 Mahalia Jackson
 Elmore James
 Etta James
 Harry James
 Homesick James
 Joni James
 Sonny James
 Waylon Jennings
 Dr. John
 Little Willie John
 Jimmy Jones
 Louis Jordan
 Don Julian
 Kitty Kallen
 Chris Kenner
 Anita Kerr
 Albert King
 B.B. King
 Ben E. King
 Earl King
 Freddie King
 Pee Wee King
 Saunders King
 Christine Kittrell
 Baker Knight
 Sonny Knight
 Buddy Knox
 Gene Krupa
 Frankie Laine
 Major Lance
 Mario Lanza
 Ellis Larkins
 Brenda Lee
 Dickie Lee
 Peggy Lee
 Lazy Lester
 Jerry Lee Lewis
 Smiley Lewis
 Little Willie Littlefield
 Julie London
 Joe Hill Louis
 Willie Love
 Frankie Lymon
 Loretta Lynn
 Dean Martin
 Grady Martin
 Janis Martin
 Johnny Mathis
 Jimmy McCracklin
 Skeets McDonald
 Big Jay McNeely
 Clyde McPhatter
 Max Merritt
 Big Maceo Merriweather
 Amos Milburn
 Chuck Miller
 Mitch Miller
 Roy Milton
 Garnet Mimms
 Bobby Mitchell
 Guy Mitchell
 Charles Mingus
 Thelonious Monk
 Bill Monroe
 Vaughn Monroe
 Wes Montgomery
 Benny Moré
 Rose Murphy
 Jimmy Nelson
 Ricky Nelson
 Robert Nighthawk
 Jimmy Nolen
 Nervous Norvus
 Donald O'Conner
 St. Louis Jimmy Oden
 Odetta
 Gene O'Quin
 Roy Orbison
 Johnny Otis
 Patti Page
 Charlie Parker
 Les Paul
 Art Pepper
 Carl Perkins
 Oscar Peterson
 Phil Phillips
 Webb Pierce
 Gene Pitney
 Pérez Prado
 Elvis Presley
 Johnny Preston
 Jimmy Preston
 Lloyd Price
 Louis Prima
 Johnnie Ray
 Tampa Red
 Jerry Reed
 Jimmy Reed
 Della Reese
 Django Reinhardt
 Buddy Rich
 Cliff Richard
 Little Richard
 Tommy Ridgley
 Billy Lee Riley
 Tex Ritter
 Johnny Rivers
 Max Roach
 Marty Robbins
 Jimmie Rodgers
 Arsenio Rodríguez
 Kenny Rogers
 Bobby Rydell
 Kyu Sakamoto
 Washboard Sam
 Tommy Sands
 Mabel Scott
 Neil Sedaka
 Pete Seeger
 Johnny Shines
 Troy Shondell
 Dinah Shore
 Frank Sinatra
 Memphis Slim
 Sunnyland Slim
 Huey "Piano" Smith
 Ray Smith
 Kay Starr
 Tommy Steele
 Joan Sutherland
 Art Tatum
 Jesse Thomas
 Rufus Thomas
 Hank Thompson
 Big Mama Thornton
 Johnny Tillotson
 Merle Travis
 Big Joe Turner
 Ike Turner
 Ritchie Valens
 Bobby Vee
 Gene Vincent
 T-Bone Walker
 Little Walter
 Mercy Dee Walton
 Baby Boy Warren
 Muddy Waters
 Johnny "Guitar" Watson
 Joe Weaver
 Ben Webster

Bands

 Jay & The Americans
 The Ames Brothers
 The Andrews Sisters
 Dave Appell & the Applejacks
 Harold Melvin & the Blue Notes 
 The Bell Notes
 The Belmonts
 Dion & The Belmonts
 The Bobbettes
 The Bonnie Sisters
 The Bosstones
 The Buchanan Brothers
 The Cadets
 The Cadillacs
 The Capris
 The Cardinals
 The Champs
 The Chantels
 The Charioteers
 Otis Williams and the Charms
 The Chimes
 The Chi-Lites
 The Chips
 The Chordettes
 The Chords
 The Cleftones
 The Clovers
 The Coasters
 The Collegians
 Bill Haley and the Comets
 The Corsairs
 The Counts
 The Crew Cuts
 The Crescendos
 The Crickets
 The Crows
 Danny & the Juniors
 Jan & Dean
 The Dells
 The Del-Satins
 The Delta Rhythm Boys
 The Del-Vikings
 Deep River Boys
 The Dovells
 The Dubs
 The Duprees
 The Diamonds
 The Drifters
 The Earls
 The Echoes
 The Edsels
 The El Dorados
 The Elegants
 The Emotions
 The Escorts
 The Everly Brothers
 The Fairfield Four
 The Falcons
 The Flamingos
 The Flairs
 The Fleetwoods
 The Five Satins
 The Five Discs
 The Five Keys
 The Five Sharps
 The Fontane Sisters
 The Four Aces
 The Four Buddies
 The Four Freshmen
 The Four Knights
 The Four Lads
 The Four Lovers
 The Four Preps
 The Four Tops 
 The Four Tunes
 The Gaylords
 The G-Clefs
 The Golden Gate Quartet
 The Harptones
 The Hearts
 The Heathertones
 The Hilltoppers
 The Hollywood Flames
 Johnny & The Hurricanes
 The Impalas
 Little Anthony and the Imperials
 The Impressions
 The Ink Spots
 The Isley Brothers
 The Jewels
 The Jesters
 The Jive Bombers
 The Jive Five
 Don & Juan
 The Jubalaires
 The Kingston Trio
 Kings of Rhythm
 The Larks
 The Lettermen
 Frankie Lymon & The Teenagers
 The McGuire Sisters
 The Medallions
 The Mello-Kings
 The Mello-Moods
 The Mills Brothers
 The Midnighters
 The Monotones
 The Moonglows
 The Mystics
 The Nutmegs
 The Oak Ridge Boys
 The Orioles
 The Osmonds 
 The Paragons
 The Penguins
 The Pied Pipers
 The Platters
 The Pony-Tails
 The Quarrymen
 The Quotations
 Randy & The Rainbows
 The Rattlesnakes (1955 band)
 The Ravens
 The Regents
 The Righteous Brothers
 Norman Fox & The Rob-Roys
 The Robins
 The Sensations
 The Shadows
 The Shepherd Sisters
 The Solitaires
 Sons of The Pioneers
 The Spaniels
 The Sparkletones
 The Spiders
 The Spinners
 Joey Dee & The Starliters
 The Stereos
 The Swallows
 Mickey & Sylvia
 Tátrai Quartet
 Tavares
 The Teenagers
 The Teen Queens
 The Tornados
 The Turbans
 The Tymes
 The Valentines
 The Virtues
 The Volumes
 Billy Ward & The Dominoes
 The Wrens
 Maurice Williams and the Zodiacs
 Windsbacher Knabenchor

Gallery

See also

Music history of the United States in the 1950s
1950s in music
1960s in music
1940s in music
Timeline of musical events

References

External links
Essential American Recordings Survey

Lists of musicians by decade
 A
Musical artists